Lance Fung is an art curator who has been responsible for several major exhibitions including "Snow Show" at the 2006 Winter Olympics in Torino, Italy.

In 1999 Fung founded Fung Collaboratives, an inter-disciplinary arts organization. Most recently, Fung transformed vacant lots in Atlantic City into a park system through his exhibition Artlantic. These “giant living sculptures” attract local residents and visiting art enthusiasts to experience art in “green” settings designed by Fung and the participants Diana Balmori, Robert Barry, Peter Hutchinson, Ilya & Emilia Kabakov, John Roloff, and Kiki Smith. Fung is curating Nonuments in Washington D.C. for the 5 x 5 project organized by the DC Commission on the Arts and Humanities. This project will result in five temporary monuments commemorating current issues such as the survivors of human trafficking, global warming, and immigrant conditions.

Books
The Snow Show (2005, Thames & Hudson)
(With Renato Miracco) Michele Ciacciofera: Silence (2010, Charta Books)

References

External links
 Fung Collaboratives official website

Living people
American art curators
Year of birth missing (living people)